The 2020 UEC European Track Championships was the eleventh edition of the elite UEC European Track Championships in track cycling and took place at the Kolodruma in Plovdiv, Bulgaria, between 11 and 15 November 2020. The event was organised by the European Cycling Union. All European champions are awarded the UEC European Champion jersey which may be worn by the champion throughout the year when competing in the same event at other competitions.

Schedule

Events

 Competitors named in italics only participated in rounds prior to the final.
 These events are not contested in the Olympics.
 In the Olympics, these events are contested within the omnium only.

Medal table

References

External links
UEC
Results
Results book

 
UEC European Track Championships
European Track Championships
2020 UEC
International cycle races hosted by Bulgaria
Sport in Plovdiv
November 2020 sports events in Europe